Keith Long (9 May 1910 – 30 June 1988) was an  Australian rules footballer who played with North Melbourne in the Victorian Football League (VFL).

Notes

External links 

1910 births
1988 deaths
Australian rules footballers from South Australia
North Melbourne Football Club players
South Adelaide Football Club players